is a Japanese  football manager and former player. He is currently manager of Fukui United.

Playing career
Fujiyoshi was born in Machida on April 3, 1970. He joined Yomiuri (later Verdy Kawasaki) from youth team in 1989. Although He played many matches as forward from first season, his opportunity to play decreased behind Japan national team players Kazuyoshi Miura and Nobuhiro Takeda. In July 1996, he moved to Kyoto Purple Sanga. Although he played as regular player, his opportunity to play decreased from 1998. In 2000, he moved to J2 League club Vegalta Sendai. He played as regular player and the club was promoted to J1 League in 2002. In 2003, he moved to China and joined Chengdu F.C. In 2004, he returned to Japan and joined Prefectural Leagues club FC Ryukyu. The club was promoted to Regional Leagues in 2005 and Japan Football League (JFL) in 2006. In 2007, he moved to Regional Leagues club New Wave Kitakyushu. The club was promoted to JFL in 2008. He retired end of 2009 season.

Managerial Career 
On 7 January 2022, Fujiyoshi has been officially appointed as the coach of Fukui United aiming for promotion to the JFL in 2023.

On 30 october 2022, he finished 3rd in the Japanese regional league league in the hokushinetsu group for failing to advance in the championship round.

Career statistics

Managerial statistics
Update; start from 2023 season

References

External links

sports.geocities.jp

1970 births
Living people
Association football people from Tokyo
Japanese footballers
Japan Soccer League players
J1 League players
J2 League players
Japan Football League players
Tokyo Verdy players
Kyoto Sanga FC players
Vegalta Sendai players
FC Ryukyu players
Giravanz Kitakyushu players
Expatriate footballers in China
Association football forwards